Downtown Disney is an outdoor shopping center at the Disneyland Resort.

Downtown Disney may also refer to:
 Disney Springs, formerly named Downtown Disney, at Walt Disney World

See also 
 Disney Village, at Disneyland Paris
 Ikspiari, at the Tokyo Disney Resort
 Disneytown, at Shanghai Disney Resort

Walt Disney Parks and Resorts